2degrees is a New Zealand telecommunications provider. Its mobile network launched on 4 August 2009 after nine years of planning. 2degrees offers prepaid and pay-monthly mobile services as well as fixed-line phone and broadband services. 2degrees is the third-largest wireless carrier in New Zealand, with 1.3 million subscribers as of July 2015.

It has spent over NZ$550 million building its mobile network, which  covers Ashburton, Auckland, Christchurch, Dunedin, Hamilton, Hastings, Invercargill, Levin, Napier, Nelson, New Plymouth, Oamaru, Palmerston North, Queenstown, Rotorua, Taupo, Tauranga, Timaru, Wanganui, Wellington and Whangarei. The network works with UMTS-900 and UMTS-2100, and LTE Band 3, 8 and 28 mobiles. In areas without 2degrees coverage, handsets roam on Vodafone NZ's GSM and UMTS network. 2degrees refers to areas where it has its own 3G coverage as "mobile broadband zones".

2degrees is owned by Voyage Australia Pty Limited and is part of its Vocus Group. Until 1 June 2022, it was majority owned by US-based Trilogy International Partners.

In March 2015 2degrees announced it had acquired Snap,
a broadband-based ISP, and from 28 July began offering broadband and home-phone services in addition to existing mobile services.

Naming
The name of the company refers to the six degrees of separation concept, which was lessened to an estimated two degrees of separation as per New Zealand's population in 2001 (3.88 million). This is no longer considered accurate; in fact, aside the fact that New Zealand's population has almost doubled in the more than two decades since, the two degrees of separation was never statistically proven and considered unlikely to be accurate. In 2015, an article in Stuff.co.nz described the theory as "another part of the myth of New Zealand exceptionalism".

Network
2degrees was formerly known as NZ Communications and previously as Econet Wireless. Planning began in 2000 but details were not revealed until 11 May 2009 and pricing was announced a day before launch. 2degrees accepted its first customers on 4 August 2009 for 2G calling/txting only. Nearly a year later on 3 August 2010 3G was turned on and new data plans announced for use in areas where 2degrees has its cell towers. 2degrees launched its 4G network in 2014.

Coverage 
2degrees had native GSM (900M/1800) with EDGE data in the main centres using Huawei kit at launch. And had a roaming agreement with Vodafone NZ (GSM with GPRS only), so had nationwide coverage on launch day. 
2degrees launched 3G (UMTS 900/2100) services in August 2010 in all coverage areas including Vodafone NZ roaming locations. 
2degrees launched 4G LTE (B3 1800) services in Auckland in June 2014 and expanded to its own network over the next two years.2degrees progressively extended its own network covering most of New Zealand s population. 
In 2020 2degrees ended its national roaming agreement with Vodafone NZ. It now has an infrastructure sharing agreement with Vodafone NZ on 200 remote towers (using Multi Operator Radio Access Network (MoRAN) technology). 
5G services went live in Auckland, Wellington, and Christchurch in March of 2022. With the launch of 5G 2degrees is progressively replacing its Huawei equipment with new Ericsson (3G,4G and 5G) kit. 
2G services were shut down in March 2018.

Currently 2degress has services on the following frequencies: 

3G UMTS 
B1 (2100 MHz),
B8 (900 MHz)

4G LTE 
B3 (1800 MHz),
B28 (700 MHz),
B8 (900 MHz),
B1 (2100 MHz)

5G 
B N78 (3500Mhz)

Rural Broadband Initiative 2 (RBI 2) and Mobile Black Spots Fund (MBSF) funding from the New Zealand Government resulted in a collaboration between 2degrees, Vodafone NZ and Spark NZ all New Zealand's mobile network operators and Crown
Infrastructure Partners. 
This new company Rural Connectivity Group (RCG) will provide new shared mobile coverage and wireless broadband using Multi Operator Radio Access Network (MoRAN) technology 
Rural Connectivity Group (RCG) sites are mostly 4G 700 (with 4G 1800 and 2100 as needed for capacity). With some 3G in tourist areas.
Each site is required to meet government targets of providing fast wireless broadband, connectivity to a tourist location, and/or coverage to rural state highways.
Plans are for over 500 new sites to be built by 2023. 

2degrees also operated a Wi-Fi network in Wellington city. The network was on a trial with some selected members of the public (about 20,000 people).

As of 2014, 4G LTE services are on (band 3) 1800 MHz. In addition (band 28) 700 MHz is on trial in central Auckland; 700 MHz ought to be able to penetrate large buildings.

2degrees shut down the 2G network on 15 March 2018.

In December 2021, 5G towers have been registered in Auckland, Wellington and Christchurch using the N78/3500MHZ band.

Standards and technologies

The company provides mobile services on its own cellular network. With support for 3G (UMTS 900 MHz and 2100 MHz) and 4G (LTE 700 MHz, 900 MHz and 1800 MHz). WiFi Calling is also supported (handset dependent).

New features
2degrees have a few features not found on other New Zealand mobile service providers.
 The ability to get settings from the SIM menu

2degrees was the first Mobile Provider in New Zealand to offer [Voice over WLAN|WiFi calling]].

MNC and dialing codes
The mobile network code is 530–24. NZ-24 or NZ Comms may be displayed on the mobile phones network list. On modern phones, with recent firmware 2degrees will be displayed.

The native STD prefix for the network is 022. New Zealand has mobile number portability, so customers switching from other networks may keep their existing mobile number.

Inbound roaming
2degrees (still called NZ Communications on the Three website and Telstra roaming site) is open to customers with handsets from some foreign networks, including Three, Telstra and Orange UK. These foreign customers can place calls using 2degrees cell sites in cities, towns and localities New Zealand described as broadband zones by 2degrees.

Expansion
In February 2011 2degrees announced that they had obtained financing for a further $100 million network expansion.

2degrees have an ongoing network expansion in place, having recently secured financing to further expand its network and roll out a 4G LTE network.

History
In 1999, the New Zealand Government auctioned off 3G spectrum radio spectrum licence. Rangiaho Everton claimed that the auction breached the Treaty of Waitangi because she believed radio spectrum is taonga and the government has no right to sell it. Everton lodged a claim with the Waitangi Tribunal, which was upheld. It was not until Labour won the 1999 election that Māori were allocated one of the four 2 GHz 3G spectrum licences at a "discounted price" - it was given and they were paid $5 million to "develop" it. In February 2001, Simon "Tex" Edwards, a former banker, established NZ Communications Limited. Later in 2001, NZ Communications received further financial backing from Strive Masiyiwa's Econet Wireless, which Edwards also owns shares, and then a 30% stake from the Hautaki Trust, which is the trading arm of the pan-Maori trust Te Hauarahi Tika. In 2007, NZ Communications Ltd began building towers for New Zealand's third mobile network.

In June 2008, Trilogy International Partners, which was established in 2005 by Strive Masiyiwa, John Stanton, Bradley Horwitz and others, purchased the 26% stake from Econet Wireless in NZ Communications Ltd.

In 2009, NZ Communications changed its name to 2degrees and began a roaming deal with Vodafone New Zealand. The deal allowed NZ Communications' customers to automatically roam onto Vodafone's 2G network. At the time the deal was announced, it was suggested the deal might also be expanded to include roaming on Vodafone's 3G network too at NZ Communications' request. Also in 2009, Trilogy increased its stake from 26% to 52% while the Hautaki Trust stake was reduced from 20% to 13%, and Eric Hertz replaced Mike Reynolds as CEO in July.

In mid 2009, 2degrees was owned by Trilogy International Partners, a US venture capital firm specializing in mobile networks (58.66%), Communication Venture Partners, a London-based company that invests in telecommunications and related software businesses (27.13%), Te Huarahi Tika Trust (10.17%) and KLR Hong Kong (0.50%). In July 2009, General Enterprise Management Services, a Hong Kong-based private equity fund, sold its 25.76 percent shares to Trilogy.

In 2012 when Tex Edwards stepped down as strategist, Trilogy owned a 58% stake in 2degrees, the Netherlands' Tesbrit BV owned a 32%, and the Hautaki Trust owned a 10% stake.

On 30 March 2013, 2degrees CEO Eric Hertz and his wife Kathy were killed when their twin-engine Beechcraft Baron, which was flying from Auckland to Timaru, ditched in the sea near Raglan at about 12:30pm after reporting engine failure. The plane was found at the bottom of the sea off the coast of Kawhia, 56 metres underwater, on 2 April. In a statement, Hertz' family thanked New Zealanders for their support. Hertz was succeeded as CEO of 2degrees by chairman Stewart Sherriff and Bradley Horwitz became chairman.

In 2016, Tex Edwards sold his remaining stake in 2degrees.

In early 2017, Trilogy International Partners owned a 73.2% stake in 2degrees. Then, Canada's Trilogy International Partners sold its 63% stake to a new entity in which Trilogy International owns a 51% stake. Later, in mid 2017, Tesbrit BV was allowed to purchase up to a 49.9% stake in 2degrees.

August 2018, CEO Stewart Sherriff announced his retirement from 2degrees. The Commerce Commission's Telecommunications Monitoring Report from December 2018, shows 2degrees mobile market share at 21%, with Vodafone at 41% and Spark at 32%. The remainder of the market is made up of MVNO operators, Skinny with 5% and the rest with 1%.

In 2019, 2degrees' Chief Financial Officer Mark Aue became the company's chief executive. On 14 April 2020, the company announced that they were to cut the workforce by 10% (i.e. 120 staff), stop recruitment, and reduce spending on capital projects in response to declining turnover caused by the coronavirus pandemic.

The company is part of New Zealand Telecommunications Forum.

Retail

2degrees has 59 retail stores, including fifteen throughout Auckland, one in Wellington City, one in Paraparaumu, four in Hamilton, two in Tauranga, two in Christchurch and one in Dunedin. The company also runs several smaller kiosk stores, which tend to be located in shopping centers. They also offer their products at 1,523,741 supermarkets, petrol stations and convenience stores.

Services
2degrees halved the prevalent pricing for prepay mobile in the New Zealand market, with voice calls costing 44 cents. SMS messages are charged at 9 cents. Customers will receive 300 to 500 free SMS messages per $30–$50 prepay top-up. Also, customers will receive a special rate of 22 cents for on-network and landline calls, as well as 2 cents per on-network SMS, provided they have topped up within the last 30 days.

Mobile Zone Data became available after 3G coverage was turned on. In regards to SIM swapping, it is worth noting that the customer must have a blank SIM card which may only be purchased from the following retailers: 2degrees Mobile (walk-in & online purchases), Harvey Norman, Noel Leeming, Warehouse Stationary and JB Hifi. 2degrees SIM cards purchased from stores such as supermarkets are not blank. 2degrees previously provided an online SIM swap option however this was removed and now SIM swaps must be completed at one of 2degrees' retail stores.

Phone numbers
2degrees auctioned 85 special numbers on New Zealand auction website TradeMe for charity, raising over $65,000. The highest selling number was 022 888 8888, likely due to the number eight being considered lucky in some Asian cultures. New customers can choose their own number, on the 2degrees website.

Marketing
2degrees has run commercials featuring Rhys Darby, a comedian known for making jokes and sketches about New Zealand life. They were filmed on location by Film Construction Ltd, a television commercial and digital content production house in Auckland.

See also
 Vodafone New Zealand
 Telecommunications in New Zealand

References

External links

 2degrees mobile

Mobile phone companies of New Zealand
Mobile technology
Companies based in Auckland
New Zealand companies established in 2009
Internet service providers of New Zealand
Telecommunications companies established in 2009